Beulah is a census-designated place (CDP) in eastern Crook County, Wyoming, United States, along Sand Creek, a tributary of the Belle Fourche River. According to local residents, the population is 33. When the 2010 census reported the population as 73, the highway sign at the town entrance was changed. In 2012, Beulah residents succeeded in appealing to the Wyoming Governor to remove the new sign and replace it with one that proclaimed the population to be 33.

Geography
Beulah is located alongside Interstate 90 which runs concurrently with U.S. Route 14. The town is northeast of Sundance, the county seat of Crook County. Although Beulah is unincorporated, it is served by the United States Postal Service and has a post office, with the ZIP code of 82712.

According to the United States Census Bureau, the CDP has a total area of 0.55 square miles (1.4 km2), all land.

Beulah is located approximately 15 miles west from Spearfish, South Dakota by I-90, and a further 62 miles east from Rapid City, South Dakota. To the west, Beulah is located 47 miles from Keyhole State Park, and around 50 miles from Devils Tower National Monument. The nearest general aviation airport is Black Hills Airport in Spearfish, and the nearest airport with commercial service is Rapid City Regional Airport.

Climate
According to the Köppen Climate Classification system, Beulah has a semi-arid climate, abbreviated "BSk" on climate maps.

Education
Public education in the community of Beulah is provided by Crook County School District #1.

References

Census-designated places in Crook County, Wyoming
Census-designated places in Wyoming